Mount Alvernia High School is a high school for girls located in Montego Bay, Saint James, Jamaica. It produces high quality students both in academics and athletics along with the other sporting disciplines. It is a school built on many principles and the young ladies who attend are held to High esteems. The ladies are fiercely smart and courteous and represents Jamaica well.

High schools in Jamaica